SriKrishna@gmail.com is a 2021 Indian Kannada romantic film written and directed by Nagashekar. The film was produced by Sandesh.N and co-produced by Brunda Jayaram under the banner Sandesh Productions. It features Krishna and Bhavana in the lead roles. The supporting cast includes H.G.Dattatreya, Sadhu Kokila and Achuyuth Kumar. The score and soundtrack for the film is by Arjun Janya and the cinematography is by Satya Hegde. The film received mixed to negative reviews from critic reviews.

Cast 

 Krishna as Sathya
 Bhavana as Malavika
 Dattanna
 Achyuth Kumar
 Sadhu Kokila
 Rishab Shetty (Cameo Appearance)
 Chandan Kumar (Cameo Appearance)

Production 
The film was announced with the muhurta on June 18 at a temple. Filming started in September 2020 in Bangalore. Later shooting took place in Mysuru and Jog falls. Actress Radhika Kumarswamy was initially approached for the female lead character, but she declined. Later the role went to actress Bhavana who agreed to be a part of the film. Actor Chandan Kumar was approached to play an extended cameo role in the film. Rishab Shetty was approached to play a pivotal cameo role in the film. The film was wrapped in July 2021.  The trailer of the film was released on 2 October 2021.

Release
The film was initially slated to hit the theaters on 14 October 2021 but owing to two other big releases, Salaga and Kotigobba 3, it was pushed a day ahead and was released on 15 October 2021.

Soundtrack 

The film's background score and the soundtracks are composed by Arjun Janya. The music rights were acquired by Anand Audio.

Reception 
The Times of India gave 2/5 stars, stating that "this romantic tale promises a lot, but doesn't eventually deliver." The idea of telling a story of an empowered woman is praised but it fails in its execution. The female lead character is painted as "more powerless than empowered" in a story filled with an "unconvincing" conflict and set of twists. The story is described as "a cop out" where "the treatment of characters seems hackneyed".

The Deccan Herald gave 2.5/5 stars and stated "The film's title is based on a twist that isn't anywhere close to shocking. Somehow, 'Shrikrishna@gmail.com' consistently struggles to be the film it wants to be."

References

External links 

 

2020s Kannada-language films
Films shot in Mysore
Films shot in Bangalore
2021 romance films
Films scored by Arjun Janya